Force H was a British naval formation during the Second World War. It was formed in 1940, to replace French naval power in the western Mediterranean removed by the French armistice with Nazi Germany. The force occupied an odd place within the naval chain of command. Normal British practice was to have naval stations and fleets around the world, whose commanders reported to the First Sea Lord via a flag officer. Force H was based at Gibraltar but there was already a flag officer at the base, Flag Officer Commanding, North Atlantic. The commanding officer of Force H did not report to this Flag Officer but directly to the First Sea Lord, Admiral of the Fleet Sir Dudley Pound.

Operation Catapult
One of the first operations that Force H took part in was connected with the reason for its formation. French naval power still existed in the Mediterranean, and the British Government viewed it as a threat to British interests. It was feared that the Vichy government of Philippe Pétain would hand the ships over to Germany, despite a vow that that would never happen. Such an incidence would almost certainly decisively tip the balance against Britain in the Mediterranean. Consequently, Force H was ordered to execute Operation Catapult.

The most powerful of the remaining French forces was in port at Mers-el-Kébir in Algeria. Force H steamed to off the Algerian coast, and an envoy was sent to the French commander. Various terms were offered, including internment of the fleet in a neutral country, joining the British forces, or scuttling the fleet at its berths. However, the commander of the French forces reported only the scuttling option to his superiors. He was thus ordered to fight. The reasons for the omission have been debated by many. It is often thought that the anti-British bias of the French commander was to blame.

The result of the action was that the remains of the French fleet escaped to Toulon, a French base on the Mediterranean coast of metropolitan France. They did so at heavy cost. The French battleship  blew up under British gunfire, killing over 1,000 French sailors. The battleship  was also badly damaged; Strasbourg and Dunkerque were also hit, although Strasbourg escaped with four destroyers.

Convoy operations

After this unpleasant operation, Force H settled down to its more normal operations. These involved general naval tasks in the western basin of the Mediterranean. Prominent amongst these tasks was fighting convoys through to Malta. The early convoys came through with relatively light losses. That changed in 1941, when the Germans sent the Luftwaffes X. Fliegerkorps to Sicily; its bombers took a high toll of both warships and merchantmen. Also, from 1942 the improved combat efficiency of the Regia Aeronautica (and especially of its SM.79 torpedo bombers) and of the Regia Marina's submarines posed a far greater threat to these convoys than the 1940 Italian opposition.

In November 1940, screening convoys to Malta, Force H made an important contribution to Operation MB8, and the resulting success of Operation Judgement, the attack on Taranto harbour.

"Sink the Bismarck!"

The most famous incident involving Force H in 1941 did not occur in the Mediterranean, but in the Atlantic Ocean. The German battleship  had sailed in company with the heavy cruiser  to attack commercial shipping. She went far to the north of the UK, passing southwest through the Denmark Strait between Iceland and Greenland. There, she was intercepted by a British force made up of the battleship  and the battlecruiser . The engagement was a disaster for the Royal Navy; Prince of Wales was damaged and Hood suffered a magazine explosion, breaking the ship in half before she sunk. Only three out of 1,418 crew aboard were recovered. Every Royal Navy unit available was then given the task of destroying Bismarck.

Force H set sail from Gibraltar to intercept Bismarck with the aircraft carrier , the battlecruiser  and the light cruiser . Despite the loss of Hood, Bismarck did not come out of the Denmark Strait engagement completely unscathed. A shell from Prince of Wales had ruptured the ship's fuel tanks, causing her to lose oil. The commerce raiding cruise was thus cut short, and the ship headed for the port of Brest in occupied France. She was found again, but the only way of stopping her was if something slowed the ship down. To try to do this, Ark Royal launched a strike with her Fairey Swordfish torpedo bombers. However, the aircrews were wrongly informed of the location of Sheffield and attacked her instead, mistaking her for Bismarck. The torpedoes that the Swordfish had dropped carried a new type of magnetic detonator which proved too unreliable. A second strike was flown carrying the older, and more reliable, contact detonator. Bismarck was found and a torpedo jammed her steering gear.

Britain at rock bottom
The end of 1941 saw the nadir of British naval fortunes in the Mediterranean. It was only the lack of action by the Italians that prevented a complete disaster for British fortunes. The most urgent task during the first part of the year was supplying Malta. The island had been under heavy attack for many months and supply convoys had to be escorted by many ships and aircraft to stand any chance of getting through. Malta was kept from starving but it was very close. Operation Pedestal, the most escorted convoy in the Second World War, took place in August and delivered enough supplies to keep Malta going.

Amphibious assaults and the end of Force H
Force H was not actually extant for a portion of 1942. It was stripped bare in May to provide ships for the assault on Vichy French forces at Diego Suarez in Madagascar during Operation Ironclad. This operation succeeded, but many argue that it was a waste of British naval resources at a critical time in the war.

November saw the turning point of the conflict. Operation Torch saw British and American forces landed in Morocco and Algeria under the British First Army. Force H was reinforced to cover these landings. The two main threats were the Italian fleet and French forces. In the end, only French forces fought, and the most significant battles took place at Casablanca where only American naval units supported the operations.

The end of the campaign in North Africa saw an interdiction effort on a vast scale. The aim was to cut Tunisia completely off from Axis support. It succeeded and 250,000 men surrendered to the 18th Army Group; a number equal to those who surrendered at Stalingrad. Force H again provided heavy cover for this operation.

Two further sets of landings were covered by Force H against interference from the Italian fleet. Operation Husky in July 1943 saw the invasion and conquest of Sicily, and Operation Avalanche saw an attack on the Italian mainland at Salerno.

Following the Allied landings on Italy itself, the Italian government surrendered. The Italian fleet mostly escaped German capture and much of it formed the Italian Co-Belligerent Navy. However, two German Fritz X radio-controlled missiles did hit and sink the battleship , killing the Commander-in-Chief of the Italian Royal Navy (Regia Marina), Admiral Carlo Bergamini.

With the surrender of the Italian fleet, the need for heavy units in the Mediterranean disappeared. The battleships and aircraft carriers of Force H dispersed to the Home and Eastern Fleets and the command was disbanded. Naval operations in the Mediterranean from now on would be conducted by lighter units.

Battles and operations of Force H
 Attack on Mers-el-Kébir The action at Oran – 3 July 1940
 The Battle of Calabria – 9 July 1940
 The Battle of Taranto – 11/12 November 1940
 The Battle of Cape Spartivento – 27 November 1940
 Operation Collar – November 1940
 Operation Excess – January 1941
 Operation Grog – 9 February 1941
 Operation Substance – July 1941
 Operation Halberd – September 1941
 Operation Ironclad as part of Force 121 – March to May 1942
 Operation Harpoon – June 1942
 Operation Pedestal – August 1942
 Operation Husky – July 1943
 Operation Avalanche – September 1943

Major combatant ships in Force H
 , aircraft carrier (June 1940 – November 1941)
 , aircraft carrier (February–August 1942)
 , battlecruiser (June–August 1940)
 , battlecruiser (August 1940 – August 1941, October 1941 – February 1943)
 , battleship (June–August 1940)
 , battleship (June 1940 – December 1941, June–October 1943)
 , battleship (December 1940 – March 1941)
 , battleship (June–September 1941, August 1942 – November 1943)
 , battleship (May 1942 – October 1943)
 , battleship (May 1943 – February 1944)
 , cruiser (June–December 1940)
 , cruiser (June 1940 – December 1941)
 , cruiser (August 1940 – October 1941)
 , cruiser (August 1940 – September 1942)
 , cruiser (August 1940 – June 1941)
 , cruiser (November 1940)
 , cruiser (April–May 1941)
 , cruiser (June 1941 – March 1942)
 , cruiser (January–August 1942)
 , cruiser (April–November 1942)
 , cruiser (October–December 1942)
 , heavy cruiser (September–December 1939)

See also
 Battle of the Mediterranean
 Military history of Gibraltar during World War II
 Malta Convoys
 Geoffrey Bennett

References

External links
 Transcription of Force H War Diary – 'admirals.org.uk'
 British Admiralty document on Mers-el-Kébir Action
 Destruction of the French Fleet at Mers El-Kebir – H.M.S. Hood

Gibraltar in World War II
Military units and formations of the Royal Navy in World War II
Military units and formations established in 1940
Royal Navy task forces
1940 establishments in the United Kingdom
1943 disestablishments in the United Kingdom
Military units and formations disestablished in 1943